Joint Forces Training Base - Los Alamitos is a joint base in Los Alamitos, California, United States. Formerly operated as a naval air station, the base contains the Los Alamitos Army Airfield and is sometimes called by that name.  The base is also known as JFTB - Los Al or just JFTB. The base covers 1,319 acres and "supports 850 full-time employees and more than 6,000 National Guard and Reserve troops."

Facilities 
JFTB has an MWR with billeting, a pub, and a banquet hall. Fiddler's Green is the last remaining military pub in Orange County.

JFTB has significant training facilities, including an Engagement Skills Trainer, a Virtual Convoy Operations Trainer, a HMMWV Egress Assistance Trainer, a Laser Marksmanship Training System, and a Close Combat Tactical Trainer.

Los Alamitos Army Airfield
The airfield has two runways:
 Runway 4L/22R: 5,902 x 150 ft. (1,799 x 46 m), surface: PEM
 Runway 4R/22L: 8,001 x 200 ft. (2,439 x 61 m), surface: asphalt/concrete

The airfield is home to Company A, 1st Battalion (Assault), 140th Aviation Regiment.

Aquatics Training Center
The JFTB Aquatics Training Center is an Olympic-size swimming pool 50m by 25m, which offers year-round lap swimming, swim lessons, and fitness classes.  The women's national water polo team regularly practices at the facility.

History 
In 1942, JFTB became a naval air base to train fighter pilots during World War II. In 1973, JFTB was transferred to the U.S. Army.

On 16 July 1957, then-Major John H. Glenn, Jr., USMC, set the transcontinental air speed record, flying a F8U-1P Crusader from NAS Los Alamitos to NAS Floyd Bennett Field, New York, in 3 hours, 23 minutes, and 8.4 seconds. Project Bullet, as the mission was called, provided both the first transcontinental flight to average supersonic speed, and the first continuous transcontinental panoramic photograph of the United States. Glenn was awarded his fifth Distinguished Flying Cross for the mission.

The senior command on post is the 40th Infantry Division (Mechanized), headquartered in the large, prominent building facing the flagpole and main entrance artery.

The base served as the Starting Line for the 14th season of the hit CBS Reality TV Show The Amazing Race. The base's status as an alternate landing area for Air Force One was mentioned in an episode of The West Wing.

The base leases the airfield to the City of Los Alamitos's for the annual Southland Credit Union Los Alamitos "Race on the Base," a charity event including a 5K Run, 5K Walk, 10K Run, 10K Skate/ Handcycle / Wheelchair, Mission: 1K Kids Run, Jr. Reverse Triathlon and Reverse Triathlon. This is the largest reverse triathlon event in the country.

On the south edge of Runway 22L is the Navy Golf Course, where Tiger Woods honed his game as a youth. The 18-hole Destroyer Course opened in 1966 and an executive nine holes was later added. The former military-only facility opened for public play in 2004.

In 2014, President Barack Obama landed at Los Alamitos Army Airfield in Air Force One in order to give the commencement speech at UC Irvine.

In April 2015, Brig Gen Nathaniel S. Reddicks became the first installation commander from the California Air National Guard.  After this command, Reddicks retired from federal service and joined the California State Military Reserve, "making him the first federally
recognized general officer to join the CSMR since the Korean War."

In October 2016, Brig. Gen. John W. Lathrop took command of the base.

Gallery

See also
 Naval Air Station Los Alamitos Naval Outlying Landing Fields during World War 2

References

External links 
 

Military installations in California
Airports in Orange County, California
Los Alamitos, California
Buildings and structures in Orange County, California
1977 establishments in California